TUT FM 96.2 is a South African university campus radio station based in Soshanguve, Gauteng. It broadcasts from the Soshanguve Campus of the Tshwane University of Technology.

The station mainly targets the youth / students.

It is one of the first campus community radio stations to be given a one-year term broadcasting licence by the then Independent Broadcasting Authority (IBA) in 1994. The station has been able to renew its licence under the Electronic Communications Act awarded in 2014.

The station broadcasts within a 50 km radius from 06:00 AM to 12:00 AM daily and has a listenership of about 50 000. It targets mainly the youth aged between 15 and 35 and broadcasts in six languages that are English, isiZulu, Sepedi, Setswana, Tshivenḓa, and Xitsonga  as per regulatory framework.

TUT FM 96.2 broadcasts on 96.2 MHz FM Stereo from studios in the Tshwane University of Technology's Soshanguve Campus to most areas in Pretoria that are within a 50 km radius including Soshanguve, Ga-Rankuwa, Mabopane, Winterveldt, Pretoria suburbs and CBD, Centurion, Hatfield, Brooklyn, and many more. The station targets the listeners between 15 – 35 in the LSM group 3–7. The programming reflects a multi-cultural flavour targeted at the young black listener in the township, high school, college and university and the community, consists of about 40% talk and 60% music and includes the local news, traffic reports, and weather reports.

Vision
The station claims that their vision is “to be leading community radio station that facilitates social development and provides programmes that are relevant to the needs and aspirations of the community we serve.”

Mission
TUT FM sees it their mission to provide information, education and entertainment to our community with responsibility, respect, honesty and integrity, and to develop the talent of all prospective radio people from the community.

Broadcast languages
English
Tswana
Venda
Zulu
Pedi
Tsonga

Broadcast time
24/7
18 hours of shows (6am to 12am)
6 hours of automated shuttle (12am to 6am)

Target audience
Low to Middle Class
Age Group 14 - 35
Semi-urban and urban audience

Programme format
60% Music
40% Talk

Listenership figures

Location
The station's physical address is:
No. 2 College Block L, Soshanguve, Gauteng

Soshanguve South campus of  Tshwane University of Technology., ± 35 km North of Pretoria CBD.

References

External links
Website
Student Radio Network
SAARF Website
Sentech Website

Student radio stations in South Africa
Tshwane University of Technology
Mass media in Gauteng